The Democratic Alliance (AD) was a centre-right conservative political alliance, in Portugal, between the Social Democratic Party (PPD/PSD), the Democratic and Social Centre (CDS) and the People's Monarchist Party (PPM) existing between 1979 and 1983. The coalition was later revived in the Azores only to contest the 2022 elections. The coalition won two seats.

History
The alliance was composed of the Social Democratic Party (PSD), the Democratic and Social Centre (CDS) and the People's Monarchist Party (PPM), including also a group of dissidents of the right wing of the Socialist Party (PS) who were disappointed by the previous Soares government, called The Reformers, including José Medeiros Ferreira (who would later rejoin the PS), António Barreto (who remained a more or less centre/rightwing aligned independent) and Francisco Sousa Tavares (who joined the Social Democratic Party afterwards). The coalition was first formed in 1979 in order to run to the December 1979 legislative election. The alliance was led by Francisco Sá Carneiro and Freitas do Amaral, and won the 1979 and 1980 legislative elections, which led to Sá Carneiro becoming Prime Minister of Portugal, but lost the presidential election of 1980 to the independent candidate António Ramalho Eanes.

After the death of Sá Carneiro on 4 December 1980, the coalition was unable to find a leader with his charisma.  Francisco Pinto Balsemão, the incoming PSD leader, became Prime Minister, but was unable to consolidate the support enjoyed by his predecessor. After its defeat in the municipal elections of 1982, it was disbanded in 1983.

Marcelo Rebelo de Sousa led an attempt to establish a new Democratic Alliance in 1998, between the PSD and the People's Party (CDS–PP; the former CDS), led by Paulo Portas.  It contested the 2004 European elections as Força Portugal, but was subsequently dissolved. However, both the PSD and CDS–PP later agreed to contest the 2014 European elections under a joint list called the Portugal Alliance.

The Democratic Alliance was revived in the Azores only to contest the 2022 elections. The coalition polled second with 34% of the votes and elected 2 MPs to Parliament.

Members of the Democratic Alliance
Social Democratic Party, (PSD)
Democratic and Social Centre, (CDS)
People's Monarchist Party, (PPM)
The Reformers

Leaders
Francisco Sá Carneiro : 1979 – 1980
Diogo Freitas do Amaral (interim) : 1980 – 1981
Francisco Pinto Balsemão : 1981 – 1983

Election results

Assembly of the Republic

Local elections

Presidential elections

References

External links
Aliança Democrática - Comissão Nacional de Eleições

CDS – People's Party
Conservative parties in Portugal
Defunct political party alliances in Portugal
Political parties established in 1979
Political parties disestablished in 1983
1979 establishments in Portugal
1983 disestablishments in Portugal
Social Democratic Party (Portugal)